Gerdakan Dar-e Sofla (also Romanized as Gerdakān Dār-e Soflá; also known as Gerdakān Dār, Gerdā Kāndār, and Gerdeh Kāndār) is a village in Sar Firuzabad Rural District, Firuzabad District, Kermanshah County, Kermanshah Province, Iran. At the 2006 census, its population was 109, in 20 families.

References 

Populated places in Kermanshah County